Glenea calypso is a species of beetle in the family Cerambycidae. It was described by Francis Polkinghorne Pascoe in 1867. It is known from Borneo, Sumatra and Malaysia.

References

calypso
Beetles described in 1867